Rosario Tijeras may refer to:

 Rosario Tijeras, a 1999 novel by Jorge Franco (writer)
Rosario Tijeras (film) (2005)
Rosario Tijeras (Colombian TV series), TV series by RCN Televisión
Rosario Tijeras (Mexican TV series), TV series by TV Azteca
"Rosario Tijeras" (song), song by Juanes